Bamboo Key is a small, tree-covered coral island located within the Florida Keys National Marine Sanctuary.

External links
 SatelliteViews.net

References
 NOAA Office of Coast Survey

Coral reefs of the Florida Keys